Zago is a fictional character who appeared in comic books published by Fox Feature Syndicate. He first appeared in Zago, Jungle Prince #1 (September 1948).

Zago was a jungle adventurer, very much like the more popular Tarzan. He was accompanied by his mate Wana, who bore a more than passing resemblance to Sheena.

References

Zago, Jungle Prince at the Grand Comics Database

Golden Age adventure heroes
Fox Feature Syndicate adventure heroes
Jungle superheroes
Jungle men